This is a list of episodes for the television series McHale's Navy.

Series overview

Episodes

Season 1 (1962–63)

Season 2 (1963–64)

Season 3 (1964–65)

Season 4 (1965–66)

References

External links
 
 

McHale's Navy
McHale's Navy